The Women's Points Race was one of the 6 women's events at the 2005 UCI Track Cycling World Championships, held in Los Angeles, United States.

15 Cyclists from 15 countries participated in the race. Because of the number of entries, there were no qualification rounds for this discipline. Consequently, the event was run direct to the final.

Final
The Final and only race was run at 18:45 on April 14. The competition consisted on 100 laps, making a total of 25 km with 10 sprints.

Elapsed Time=34:54.480
Average Speed=42.970 km/h

References

Women's points race
UCI Track Cycling World Championships – Women's points race